The Governor of Gilgit Baltistan is the appointed Head of State of the provincial government in Gilgit-Baltistan, Pakistan. The governor is designated by the Prime Minister and is normally regarded a ceremonial post. However, throughout the history of Pakistan, the powers of the provincial governors were vastly increased, every time the provincial assemblies were dissolved and the administrative role came under direct control of the governors.

The current governor is Syed Mehdi Shah, who assumed office on 15 August 2022.

List of governors

Following is the list of governors after Gilgit-Baltistan was given the status of a province on 29 August 2009, when the federal cabinet had approved the Gilgit-Baltistan (Empowerment and Self-governance) Order 2009.

Timeline

See also 
 Chief Minister (Gilgit-Baltistan)
 Government of Gilgit-Baltistan
 Gilgit-Baltistan Legislative Assembly
 List of Governors of Pakistan
 List of Chief Ministers in Pakistan

References

External links 

 
Provincial political office-holders in Pakistan